Kasangadu is a village located in Madukkur Panchayat Union, Pattukkottai taluk, Thanjavur District, Tamil Nadu State, India. It is one of the 32 villages forming the  Musgundhanadu, a Velalar Commune.  It is surrounded by Moothakuruchi to north, Vattakudi and Regunathapuram to east, Mannangadu to south, Vendakottai to south west, Nattuchalai to west. The total geographical area of the village is 242.34 hectares. 

Many people from this village have settled in foreign countries like Singapore, United Arab Emirates, Malaysia, United Kingdom, France, Australia, United States of America, Poland.

History 

Kasangadu village is a perfect example of modern village in India. Right from administration until the contribution of every citizens is covered.
More about Kasangadu's history may be obtained from (Tamil: Kasangadu History)

Lake 

This supplies water for irrigation to part of the lands in Kasangadu. This is the biggest lake in this village. The origin of water for this lake is from Cauvery river from Kallannai. This third largest lake in pattukkottai area.

Economy 

Paddy Cultivation is the main source of income for all the villagers in Kasangadu.

Muniswarar Temple 

The deity Muniveeswarar is mainly prayed for border security to the farming lands/village to prevent any theft/disasters to the cultivation/Village.

Support Links 
Kasangadu Groups

Musugundan Matrimony
Village Cuisine
Kasangadu Education
)

References 
காசாங்காடு கிராமம்
Kasangadu Village in English
Website to list of schools in Kasangdu
of Panchayat Raj, Government of India
Villages Information about Kasangadu

Villages in Thanjavur district